Highland Avenue Historic District is a national historic district located at Lexington, Lafayette County, Missouri.   The district encompasses 64 contributing buildings, 6 contributing structures, and 2 contributing objects in a predominantly  residential section of Lexington. It developed between about 1830 and 1930, and includes representative examples of Late Victorian and Greek Revival style architecture.  Notable contributing resources include the William H. Russell House (c. 1845), William H. Russell House (c. 1840), Frick House (c. 1840), Arnold House (c. 1848), Madonna of the Trail Monument (1928), Hinesley House (c. 1840), O'Malley-Kelly House (c. 1850), and Old Winkler House (c. 1855).

It was listed on the National Register of Historic Places in 1983. The Missouri statue for the Madonna of the Trail is located there.

References

Historic districts on the National Register of Historic Places in Missouri
Greek Revival architecture in Missouri
Victorian architecture in Missouri
Buildings and structures in Lafayette County, Missouri
National Register of Historic Places in Lafayette County, Missouri